Thexylborane is a borane with the formula [Me2CHCMe2BH2]2 (Me = methyl).  The name derives from "t-hexylborane" (although the group is not the standard tert-hexyl group), and the formula is often abbreviated ThxBH2.  A colorless liquid, it is a rare, easily accessed monoalkylborane.  It is produced by the hydroboration of tetramethylethylene:
B2H6  +  2 Me2C=CMe2  →  [Me2CHCMe2BH2]2

Reactions
Thexylborane is generated in situ.  In solution, it isomerizes over the course several days to the 2,3-dimethyl-1-butyl derivative, shown as the monomer here:
Me2CHCMe2BH2  →  Me2CHCH(Me)CH2BH2

Thexylborane allows the synthesis of ketones by coupling a pair of alkenes with carbon monoxide, which serves as a carbonyl linchpin:
Me2CHCMe2BH2  +  2 RCH=CH2  →  Me2CHCH(Me)CH2B(CH2CH2R)2
Me2CHCH(Me)CH2B(CH2CH2R)2  +  CO  +  H2O  →   O=C(CH2CH2R)2  +  ...
An important feature of this reagent is that the thexyl group almost never undergoes anionotropic 1,2-migration from boron to a neighboring atom.

References

Organoboranes